Higley is a surname. Notable people with the surname include:

Brewster Higley (1823–1911), otolaryngologist who became famous for writing "The Western Home"
Dena Higley (born 1958), American television soap opera writer who lives in Los Angeles, California
Harvey V. Higley (1892–1986), Ansul Chemical Company president (1938–48) and chairman of the board
Michael J. Higley (born 1975), Professor of Neuroscience, Yale University

See also
Higley, Arizona, unincorporated community in Maricopa County, Arizona, United States
Higley Flow State Park, located in the township of Colton in St. Lawrence County, New York in the USA
Higley High School, high school in Gilbert, Arizona, USA